Aframomum amaniense is a monocotyledonous plant species described by Ludwig Eduard Loesener. Aframomum amaniense is part of the genus Aframomum and the family Zingiberaceae. No subspecies are listed in the Catalog of Life.

References 

amaniense
Flora of Africa